

Kits

|
|
|

Squad

Statistics

|-
|Colspan=14|Players who left during the course of the season:

|}

Goals record

Disciplinary Record

Transfers

In

Loans in

Out

Loans out

Match details

Pre-season

League One

League table

Matches

FA Cup

League Cup

Football League Trophy

Overall summary

Summary

Score overview

References 

2014-15
2014–15 Football League One by team